The Polish State Railways (Polish: Polskie Koleje Państwowe, abbr.: PKP) is the dominant railway operator in Poland.
The company was founded when the former Polish State Railways state-owned enterprise was divided into several units based on the need for separation between infrastructure management and transport operations. Polish State Railways is the dominant company in PKP Group collective that resulted from the split, and maintains in 100% share control, being fully responsible for the assets of all of the other PKP Group component companies. The group's organisations are dependent upon Polish State Railways, but proposals for privatisation have been made.

PKP today

Pricing system
The pricing system currently employed by PKP is highly regressive. On international routes such as, for example, the Berlin-Warsaw Express and the IC-Nightbus Warsaw – Vilnius, a global pricing system is in use which requires one to buy two separate tickets (one in each direction) in place of a single consolidated return ticket. The long-distance and local trains' pricing systems are separated from each other in entirety and thus tickets issued by local train operators cannot be used on long-distance services, with the opposite also true. International tickets, however, are valid on all services upon which one is required to travel on order to reach the final destination stated on the ticket (unless a specific routing is stipulated in the terms of the conditions of use).

Development of current services, infrastructure and high-speed rail

Since 2009 PKP's subdivision Polskie Linie Kolejowe (Polish Railway Lines) has been using the new 'Dworzec Polski' (Polish Station) brand. This branding and its corresponding PR campaign 'ROBI SIĘ!' (IT'S GETTING READY!) was developed in order to shed more light on station redevelopments all around the country. The ethos of the brand essentially requires that the station in question be completely transformed to meet the highest modern standards of comfort and technical service before being allowed to become a member of the 'Dworzec Polski' network. Currently, there are 77 stations taking part in the 'ROBI SIĘ!' programme, amongst which are included the main stations of Warsaw, Katowice, Kraków, Wrocław, and Gdynia.

History

Regaining independence on 11 November 1918 allowed Poland to reclaim the former Russian and Austrian sectors from military railways. The Railway Department in the Ministry of Communication was created and the Polish railways were officially named Polskie Koleje Państwowe.

In December 1918, the Greater Poland Uprising started. The rebels took over the former Prussian sector of railways. One year later, the fights for Lwów were over and the former Austrian railway directorate was taken over by Poland. Taking over the railways from Prussians lasted until 1921.

After the victory over the Red Army in the Polish-Bolshevik War (1920), a great deal of damage in railway structure was discovered on the route along which the communists were retreating. At the same time, the tense relations with Lithuania led the railways around Vilnius and Minsk to a partial disintegration and stagnation. The Libau–Romny Railway was not recovered.

Polish railways administration finally took over the railways in Upper Silesia in 1922. That same year, a decision was made to divide railways in Poland into nine administrative districts.

An economic crisis in the 1930s forced the state to cut back its budget for railway investment. Profit decreased by 50% compared to 1929. The next year, over 23,000 PKP employees had been dismissed and protests and strikes causes authorities to try to find a solution. The end of the crisis and an increase in cargo transport and income came in 1937.

On 1 September 1939,  the railwaymen of Szymankowo stopped a German armoured train before its arrival on the bridge over the Vistula River and the Polish soldiers reattached the explosive charges disconnected by the German dive bombers and blew up the bridge. The railwaymen and some of their innocent family members were executed by the Germans the same day, 1 September 1939. After the Soviet invasion of eastern Poland on 17 September 1939, most Polish rolling stock fell into Soviet hands.

The Polish railways in Silesia, Greater Poland and Pomerania were adopted by German railways Deutsche Reichsbahn on 25 September. The Polish railways in Generalgouvernement became Ostbahn.

Until the last moment before the German attack on the Soviet Union in 1941, cargo trains transported goods from the Soviet Union to Germany. The beginning of German attacks on the Soviet Union on 22 June 1941 resulted in the possession of railway and rolling stock by the Ostbahn and the possession of PKP rolling stock with broad gauge track and reconstruction to standard gauge. The beginning of organized sabotage by the Polish resistance movement on railways took place about the same time.

In 1942, production of simple military-use DR Kriegslok BR52 (PKP class Ty2) steam locomotives began in Poznań and Chrzanów; the steam boilers for these locomotives were produced in Sosnowiec.

The Warsaw Uprising caused widespread damage of Warsaw rolling stock, network and electric traction; both bridges over the Vistula River and the tunnel on the Warsaw Cross-City Line were destroyed.
At the beginning of 1945, the Ministry of Transport was created, as well as the Regional Directorate of National Railways. Many pre-war locomotives were sent to the Soviet Union. Poland received many German locomotives as a compensation for war losses. In June, the rail connection with Warsaw was opened, using a temporary railway station made of warehouses. On 15 September 1945, PKP took over management of all railway lines on new Polish territory from the Soviet Union. Most of these lines were either destroyed or inaccessible. The railways in the country were divided into ten districts.

During the mid-to-late communist era, the state of the Polish railways deteriorated to a large extent. Once a large and profitable network, the systemic lack of funding and failure to acquire new rolling stock left PKP far behind the railway operators of Western Europe in terms of technical advances and passenger comfort. In addition to this, the poor state of many rail lines throughout the country led to ever-increasing journey times for passengers, and as a result left the railways far less able to compete with intercity bus and air services. During the entire communist period, only one major infrastructural project relating to the railways was completed. This, the Central Trunk Line, was a prestige project completed in 1976, intended both for heavy coal transport and fast passenger services. This line for the first time allowed passengers to travel in comfort and at relatively high speed from Kraków and Katowice to Warsaw; however, high-speed services have never started, although test runs reached 250 km/h in 1994. Moreover, despite the successful completion of the section from southern to central Poland, the planned extension to Gdańsk and the country's Baltic ports was never realised, and this significantly curtailed both the usefulness and potential of the line.

Since Poland's return to the sovereignty in the early 1990s, the Polish State Railways have faced ever-increasing competition from private automotive transport and the country's rapidly expanding network of motorways and express roads. However, ever-decreasing journey times, better schedules which allow for well-coordinated connections, the rise of private operators and large-scale investment in infrastructure as well as new rolling stock is slowly enticing people back onto the railways.

On 14 December 2014 PKP Intercity Pendolino trains began operating on the CMK line (224 km line from Kraków and Katowice to Warsaw) with trains reaching 200 km/h (124 mph) as a regularly scheduled operation. There is a plan by PKP Polskie Linie Kolejowe (infrastructure manager) to increase speed to 250 km/h on whole line soon.
In the day of 13 December 2020 the speed limit was raised to 200 km/h also on the line from Warsaw to seaport Gdynia by New Pendolino train.

Corporate Subdivisions

PKP Intercity

PKP Intercity is a semi-independent division of PKP that operates long-distance passenger trains in Poland. It was founded in 2001 when, in preparation for separation between infrastructure management and transport operations, the Polish State Railways were reorganized into a number of independent operating companies under the unified direction of the PKP Group.

PKP Intercity operates all InterCity trains in Poland as well as most of the country's EuroCity services throughout Europe. Although competition is rising in the long-distance rail travel market in Poland, PKP Intercity still holds a de facto monopoly in the industry, as its current market share represents almost 100% of the segment.

PKP Intercity's trains currently (2015) operate under the following brands:

Express InterCity Premium (EIP) - Pendolino high-speed trains
EuroCity (EC): International trains which operate major routes and require a reservation
Express InterCity (EIC) - introduced in 2009, as a result, the train category EX was phased out
InterCity (IC) - Intercity trains
Twoje Linie Kolejowe (TLK) - Low cost, intercity trains
InterCityBus (ICBUS)- Intercity coach services

PKP Cargo

PKP Cargo, founded in 2001 so as to satisfy a European Court ruling on the required restructuring of the Polish State Railways prior to joining the EU, is the PKP group company responsible for freight transport operations. It is currently the largest railway cargo carrier in Poland, and second-largest in the European Union.
The company was founded after dividing Polskie Koleje Państwowe (all-national rail operator) into several dozens of companies to meet European Union Standards.

PKP Cargo is owned by the PKP S.A. (50% + 1 share) and private investors.

PKP Szybka Kolej Miejska

It is a railway transportation service that originally functioned in Poland's Tricity area (Gdynia, Sopot and Gdańsk). The system has since grown to cover a longer route, reaching towns like Słupsk, Lębork and Wejherowo.

It is serviced by electric multiple unit cars at a frequency of 6 minutes to half an hour between trains (depending on the time of day). It is comparable to subway service or light rail in other European cities. The Tricity area is uniquely suited for this mode of transport, as it's shaped in a relatively narrow north–south corridor between the Gdańsk Bay and the Tricity Landscape Park.

PKP Linia Hutnicza Szerokotorowa

PKP LHS is a company of the PKP Group responsible for infrastructure operation and freight transport on the Broad Gauge Metallurgy Line. The line runs for about 400 km from the Polish-Ukrainian border in Izow-Hrubieszów to Sławków Południowy (near Katowice).

The line was opened in 1979 and was used to import iron ore from the USSR, as well as to export coal and sulphur from Poland.
After the fall of communism and the economic changes of 1989 traffic on the line has much diminished.  At present various schemes are being tried to increase its profitability.
This line runs as a single-track line for almost 400 km, from the Polish-Ukrainian border crossing just east of Hrubieszów to Sławków Południowy (near Katowice). It is used only for freight traffic, mainly iron ore and coal.  It is the westernmost broad gauge railway line in Europe that is connected to the broad gauge rail system of the countries which before 1991 constituted the Soviet Union.

Transfer of regional services to Przewozy Regionalne

Until December 22, 2008, Przewozy Regionalne was a wholly owned subsidiary of the PKP Group; after that date, all of its shares have been transferred to Poland's 16 regional governments. Thus, the company is no longer part of the PKP Group and on interregional routes its InterRegio trains compete with PKP Intercity TLK trains. This was done in order to increase competition amongst operators on the Polish rail network. The company finally changed its name from PKP Przewozy Regionalne to Przewozy Regionalne on December 8, 2009.

Przewozy Regionalne now operates a large range of domestic rail services under the following brands: Regio (local passenger services which stop at all stations), RegioPlus (semi-fast local passenger services which stop at a lesser number of stops than Regio but for which tickets do not cost more), InterRegio (low-cost, fast inter-regional services with 2nd class only and which stop at medium and major stations only) and RegioEkspres (fast trains on international routes with both 1st and 2nd class).

For domestic routes, InterRegio and RegioEkspres trains share the same fare for 2nd class (meaning you can board an RE train with an IR ticket and vice versa). With the exception of the Szczecin-Warsaw and Poznań-Warsaw RegioEkspres trains, there is no reservation required in any of Przewozy Regionalne's trains.

Until December 1, 2008, the company also used to run over 300 interregional and international fast trains, but per the government's decision, all its interregional and international fast train services were transferred back to its then-sister company, PKP Intercity S.A. and rebranded to 'Tanie Linie Kolejowe' (Cheap Railway Lines), this was then itself renamed in 2010 to 'Twoje Linie Kolejowe' (Your Railway Lines).

Przewozy Regionalne trains are currently operated under the following brands: 2015

Regio
InterRegio
RegioExpress
InterRegioBus - BUS

Power supply 

Electric train traction of Polish State Railway started in 1936 in Warsaw area and is performed since the beginning with 3 kV DC. On January 1, 2011, 11481 kilometres were electrified by a total length of 19276 kilometres.

All used power is taken from the public grid and rectified in substations. Most substations are fed with voltages between 15 and 30 kV. Where lines have heavy traffic and higher speed, the substations are fed from the 110 kV grid.

The switchyard of substations fed from voltages below 30 kV is indoors, outdoor switchgear is used at 110 kV. The distance between substations is between 15 and 28 kilometres. For reliability of supply, substations are usually fed by at least two powerlines. Each substation normally feeds two segments of the overhead wire, which are separated by a switch. As is common with DC systems, the negative pole is grounded.
Halfway between two substations, there is a switch, which can be used to connect the overhead wires together. At some lines, a three-phase AC line operated with 6 kV, 15 kV or 20 kV runs parallel to the railway line, either on the poles of the overhead wire or on separate poles. It is used for power supply of signals, level crossing equipment and other devices requiring electric power used for the rail. This line can be also used for emergency power supply of substations.

Other PKP subsidiary companies

Polskie Linie Kolejowe

The PKP Group company responsible for maintenance of rail tracks, conducting trains across the country, scheduling train timetables, and management of railway property, such as lines and stations.

PKP Energetyka

A company of PKP Group, responsible for supplying Polish railroad operators with electric energy.
PKP Energetyka was founded after dividing PKP into a group of several dozen independent companies to meet European Union Standards.

PKP Group has sold PKP Energetyka.

WARS S.A.
WARS is the PKP subsidiary responsible for the servicing of restaurant and sleeper cars on long-distance and international trains operated by PKP Intercity and their partners.

See also 
 History of rail transport in Poland
 List of railway companies
 List of Railway lines of Poland
 PKP classification system
 PKP Group
 Polish State Railroads in summer 1939
 Przemyślanin
 Rail transport in Poland
 Transportation in Poland

References

External links
Online timetable
PKP - Polish State Railways

Railway companies of Poland
PKP Group companies
Polish brands
Polish companies established in 2001
Railway companies established in 2001
Government-owned railway companies